Prof. Emeritus Drs. Abdul Djalil Pirous (born March 11, 1932), known as A.D. Pirous, is an Indonesian fine arts artist and lecturer. He is a pioneer in graphic design education at the Fine Arts Institute of Technology in Bandung, and the founder of an art and design studio called Decenta (1973–1983). A.D. Pirous is married to Erna Garnasih Pirous, and the couple has three children.

He is known as one of the leading artist of modern Abstract art in Indonesia, together with Ahmad Sadali and Umi Dachlan, who were an integral part of The Bandung School. Within his works, he was a pioneering painter and calligrapher depicting the Qur'an and Acehnese ethnic ornaments in an abstract, spiritual way.

Life 
Abdul Djalil Pirous, known as A.D. Pirous was born in Meulaboh, Aceh. His father was named Mauna Pirous Noor Mohamad, and his mother was named Hamidah.

In 1964, he completed his education at the Department of Fine Arts, Bandung Institute of Technology (ITB), where he was a student of Ries Mulder, the influential Dutch painter and lecturer. Thereafter, he continued his studies in printmaking and graphic design at the Rochester Institute of Technology, Rochester New York, United States (1969).

Between 1964 and 2002, he worked at the FDSR-ITB, the Fine Arts and Design Faculty of the ITB - Bandung. He served as the first Dean of the Faculty of Art and Design ITB (1984-1990), and was inaugurated as a professor at ITB since 1994.

A.D. Pirous is married to Ernah Garmasih Pirous, an accomplished painter herself. Erna studied at the ITB as well as in France, and she belongs to the 2nd generation of Indonesian women artists, which influenced Indonesian Art in the second half of the 20th Century. A.D. and Erna Pirous have three children, Mida Meutia, Iwan Meulia, and Raihan Muerila.

In 2003, the couple started to build their dream home in Bandung, which they finished in 2004. Still striving in their 80s, they added a Gellery named "Serambi Pirous" in 2017, where they work and display their art.

Work 
Pirous has experience working since the colonial period, the Old Order, and the New Order until the Reformation. He has produced many works since 1960. It is his works that have made Pirous a reformer of modern painting with an Islamic background in Indonesia.

As a painter, his career began in 1960, and his works have been exhibited in hundreds of national and international exhibitions. His solo exhibitions have been held five times including: Retrospective Exhibition I for works 1960–1985, at the Taman Immanuel Marzuki, Jakarta in 1985 and Retrospective II for works from 1985 to 2002, at the Indonesian National Gallery, Jakarta in 2002.

His painting style is easily recognizable as the textures and colors are made very elaborate and patient. How to paint it is made by coating the color with alabaster paste and a palette knife. The exhibition's differentiator is Ayat-ayat Semesta, which focuses on the style of Pirous's work.

Since the early 21st Century, a growing international interest in Indonesian modern and abstract art has brought painters such as A.D. Pirous, Ahmad Sadali, Fadjar Sidik, Popo Iskandar and Umi Dachlan to the international art market.

Islamic calligraphy 
Of the various topics that Pirous discusses in his work other than natural objects, landscapes, daily life, animal figures, abstracts and others, calligraphy works that take up Pirous's time, energy and thoughts. For the first time since the birth of Pirous's etching work featuring Arabic calligraphy, Surah Al-Ikhlas: Pure Faith (1970), the term 'calligraphy' 'Islam' in Indonesia (two terms that stand alone and accompany 'art' and 'modern' painting) attached to Pirous.

Pirous started his Islamic calligraphy work when he saw the exhibition of Ceramic Fragments, Ancient Islamic manuscripts, Al-Qur'an Calligraphy and miniature paintings which had been exhibited at the Metropolitan Museum of Art, New York, United States around the 1960s. Seeing these objects reminded Pirous of his hometown in Aceh and strongly influenced Pirous's works. Together with Ahmad Sadali and Umi Dachlan, they represents a strong Indonesian and religious component of the Abstract Art at the ITB. Their work therefore contradicts the "East versus West" statement that was used since 1954 to decry the Art Faculty in Bandung as a laboratory of the West.

Architecture 

Pirous designed the ornamentation for the building of the Bank Indonesia in Padang, among other architectural projects.

Decenta Design Studio 

In 1973, A.D. Pirous founded the Decenta Design Studio, an abbreviation from Design Center Association together with Adriaan Palar, T. Sutanto  and G. Sidharta. The members of the design bureau were known to use silkscreen as a medium for the expansion of Indonesian graphic arts. This group was an extension of their first joint work from 1971, a folio of 18 screenprint from leading artists at the ITB published under the title Grup 18. They were quite intensive in experimenting with screen printing or screen printing techniques, yet studio Decenta closed in 1983.

Pirous is one of Indonesia's leading painters, and his paintings are displayed in the collection of the National Gallery of Indonesia, Jakarta, including the painting "The Roof of Heaven and Earth is Expansive" from 1990.

Exhibitions 
A.D. Pirous' works have been exhibited in hundreds of national and international exhibitions.

Solo Exhibitions:
 Retrospective I for works 1960–1985, in the Taman Izmail Marzuki, Jakarta (1985)
 Retrospective II for works 1985–2002, at Galeri Nasional, Jakarta (2002)
 Ja'u Timu at Selasar Sunaryo Art Space, Bandung (2012)
 Verses of the Universe in Kuala Lumpur, Malaysia (2015)
 A.D Pirous: Spiritual Calligraphy. World Trade Center, Jakarta (2016)

Group Exhibitions:
 Investigating the Collection: National Collection of Fine Arts Exhibition, National Gallery Indonesia, Jakarta, 10–28 October 2018.

Awards 
Pirous received numerous awards for his achievements as an artist and humanist:

● Best Print at the Art Show Naples, New York, United States of America (1970)
● Best Painting at the Exhibition Biennale I Arts Council Jakarta (1974)
● Best Painting at the Exhibition Biennale II Arts Council Jakarta (1976)
● Bronce Medal of the Foreign Ministry, Republic Korea (1984)
● Art Award by the Minister of Education and Culture (1985)
● Satyalancana Medal for cultural achievements by the President of the Republic of Indonesia (2002)
● Habibie Award for Cultural Studies (2015)

He has been appointed several times as head of the delegation, member of the jury, and curator of international art exhibitions, representing Indonesia.

Bibliography

References

Monographs 
 A.D. Pirous: Vision, faith, and a journey in Indonesian art, 1955–2002. by K.M. George & Mamannoor. (Yayasan Serambi Pirous, 2002 - 255 pages) 
 A.D. Pirous: Melukis itu Menulis (Painting is Writing). by Dudy Wiyancoko, Editor. (ITB, Bandung, 2003 - 252 pages, numerous photos) 
 Melukis Islam: Amal dan Etika Seni Islam di Indonesia. by Kenneth M. George, Hawe Setiawan (Translator), Dudy Wiyancoko (Editor) and A.D. Pirous (Yayasan Serambi Pirous, 2009 - 250 pages) 
 Notes of a collector : A.D. Pirous' spiritual message. by Wahyuni Bahar. (PT Telaga Ilmu Indonesia, 2012 - 87 pages)

General Art Literature 
 "Bandung: The Laboratory of the West?". Helena Spanjaard in: Modern Indonesian Art, 1945-1990. Published by Fischer, Berkeley, CA, USA, 1990, page 54–77. 
 "Ketiga Kata Ketika Warna. In Words In Colours". Puisi dan Luisan - Poetry and Colours. Published by Yayasan Ananda; Ed. 1 edition, English and Indonesian, 1995. Includes 1 paintings of A.D. Pirous. 
 "Indonesian Heritage: Visual Art". Hildawati Soemantri, published by Editions Didier Miller, Singapore, 1998. Includes 1 painting of A.D. Pirous. 
 "Modern Indonesian Art: From Raden Saleh to the Present Day." Koes Karnadi et al., Published by Koes Artbooks, Denpasar, Bali. 2nd rev. Ed. 2010. 
 "Artists and their Inspiration. A Guide Through Indonesian Art History (1930-2015)." Helena Spanjaard. LM Publishers, Volendam, The Netherlands, 2016. Includes 2 paintings of A.D. Pirous, pages 89–90.

Videography 
 Interview AD Pirous - Pasar Seni ITB pertama 1972 by Pasar Seni Indonesia, 28 Oct 2013 (in Bahasa Indonesia). Youtube: Interview AD Pirous by Pasar Seni Indonesia
 A.D. Pirous: "Melukis Itu Proses Mencatat" by Mizan, 22 May 2014 (in Bahasa Indonesia). Youtube: "Painting is a Writing Process" by Mizan
 Opening of the Serambi Pirous Gallery - 86 Years of A.D. Pirous, 12 May 2018 (in Bahasa Indonesia). Youtube: Serambi Pirous Gallery - 86 Years of A.D. Pirous

People from Aceh
Bandung Institute of Technology alumni
Academic staff of Bandung Institute of Technology
Abstract expressionist artists
Abstract painters
20th-century Indonesian painters
1932 births
Living people
Indonesian graphic designers